Čaušić is a Serbo-Croatian surname, derived from čauš, a borrowing of the Turkish word çavuş. It may refer to:

Andrej Čaušić (born 1990), Croatian footballer
Goran Čaušić (born 1992), Serbian footballer

See also
Čaušević, surname
Čauševići, place name

Serbian surnames
Croatian surnames